Twenty Five is a video album by British singer George Michael, released on DVD in November 2006. It contains forty videos on two discs, including seven with Wham!. The Twenty Five album was also released at the same time.

Track listing

Disc one
 "Club Tropicana"
 "Wake Me Up Before You Go-Go"
 "Freedom"
 "Last Christmas"
 "Everything She Wants"
 "I'm Your Man"
 "The Edge of Heaven"
 "Careless Whisper"
 "A Different Corner"
 "I Knew You Were Waiting (For Me)" (with Aretha Franklin)
 "I Want Your Sex"
 "Faith"
 "Father Figure"
 "One More Try"
 "Monkey"
 "Kissing a Fool"
 "Freedom! '90"
 "Don't Let the Sun Go Down on Me" (with Elton John)
 "Too Funky"

Disc two
 "Fastlove"
 "Jesus to a Child"
 "Spinning the Wheel"
 "Older"
 "Outside"
 "As" (with Mary J. Blige)
 "Freeek!"
 "Amazing"
 "John and Elvis Are Dead"
 "Flawless (Go to the City)"
 "Shoot the Dog"
 "Roxanne"
 "An Easier Affair"
 "If I Told You That" (with Whitney Houston)
 "Waltz Away Dreaming"
 "Somebody to Love" (with Queen)
 "I Can't Make You Love Me"
 "Star People" '97
 "You Have Been Loved"
 "Killer/Papa Was a Rollin' Stone"
 "Round Here"

Charts

Certifications and sales

References

 

George Michael albums
2006 video albums